Battery Oldenburg is a German artillery battery, built during World War II as part of the Atlantic Wall, and situated east of Calais. The battery began in 1940 with artillery guns in an open emplacement. The Organisation Todt built casemates around two  240mm guns during the war.

Both casemates or Turms (towers) are 35 meters long and 15 meters high, positioned in a slight offset from each other to gain a broader range with both guns. Turm East and Turm West housed guns of Russian origin that were captured by the German army during World War I and re-chambered by Krupp from 255mm to 240mm.

Both casemates are 35 meters long and 15 meters high above ground level. The western of the two casemates, Turm West is two storeys deep, while the eastern casemate, Turm East, is three storeys deep.

Besides the two casemates, battery Oldenburg has a combined fire control and hospital bunker, which still has a beautiful fresco and other paintings, ammunition bunkers and personnel bunkers. Behind the two casemates and fire control bunker is the barrack site used by Organisation Todt.

The battery was under the command of the Kriegsmarine section 2./MAA 244 from 1941 onwards. Battery Oldenburg was part of the coastal defence of the Strait of Dover and situated in the Hellfire Corner. Battery Oldenburg is also known as "le Moulin Rouge".

Battery Oldenburg surrendered to Canadian forces in 1944.

See also 

 Todt Battery

References
 LandmarkScout.com - English language 
 Festungbauten.de  - German language

External links
 LandmarkScout - Battery Oldenburg; Heavy Defender on the Hellfire Corner

Oldenburg
Coastal fortifications
Military history of the English Channel
World War II defensive lines
World War II in the Pas-de-Calais
World War II sites in France
World War II sites of Nazi Germany
Nazi architecture